The New Zealand sand diver (Tewara cranwellae) is a species of sandburrower endemic to the waters around New Zealand where it can be found in tide pools and areas with sandy substrates down to a depth of .  This species can grow to a length of  TL.  This species is the only known member of its genus.

References

New Zealand sand diver
Endemic marine fish of New Zealand
New Zealand sand diver